Pindi Hazara Chana (born 24 January 1974) is a Tanzanian CCM politician and a special seat Member of Parliament since 2010. In January 2022 she began her cabinet carrear as the Minister of State (Policy, Parliamentary Affairs, Labour, Youth, Employment and Persons with Disabilities) in the Prime Minister's Office. Following a mini cabinet re-shuffle on 31st March 2022 Chana assumed the Ministry of Natural Resources & Tourism office. She exchanged positions with Mohamed Mchengerwa following another cabinet reshuffle as the new Minister of Culture, Arts and Sports in February 2023.

References

1974 births
Living people
Chama Cha Mapinduzi MPs
Tanzanian MPs 2010–2015
Deputy government ministers of Tanzania
Shinyanga Commercial School alumni
University of Dar es Salaam alumni
Mzumbe University alumni
Tanzanian Roman Catholics